Events in the year 1938 in the British Mandate of Palestine.

Incumbents
 High Commissioner – Sir Arthur Grenfell Wauchope until 1 March; Sir Harold MacMichael
 Emir of Transjordan – Abdullah I bin al-Hussein
 Prime Minister of Transjordan – Ibrahim Hashem until 28 September; Tawfik Abu al-Huda

Events

 4 January – The British government appoints the Woodhead Commission to explore the practicalities of the partition of Palestine.
 10 January – James Leslie Starkey, a noted British archaeologist of the ancient Near East and Palestine who leads the first excavations in Tel Lachish, is killed by a gang of armed Arabs near Bayt Jibrin on a track leading from Bayt Jibrin to Hebron.
 23 February – The Port of Tel Aviv officially opens, as a competing (Jewish) port to the port in Jaffa, the latter having been crippled by the Arab revolt and general strike since 1936.
 1 March – Sir Harold MacMichael assumes office as the High Commissioner of Palestine.
 21 March – The founding of the kibbutz Hanita
 13 April – The founding of the moshav Shavei Tzion as part of the tower and stockade settlement scheme.
 26 June – The founding of the kibbutz Alonim
 29 June – Shlomo Ben-Yosef executed for ambushing an Arab bus near Safad.
 6 July – 18 Arabs and 5 Jews were killed by two simultaneous bombs in the Arab melon market in Haifa, 79 people were wounded.
 16 July – 10 Arabs were killed and 29 wounded by a bomb at a marketplace in Jerusalem.
 17 July – The founding of the kibbutz Ma'ale HaHamisha
 25 July – The founding of the kibbutz Tel Yitzhak
 25 July – 39 Arabs were killed and over 60 wounded by a second bomb in the Haifa vegetable market.
 16 August – Former Jewish policeman Mordechai Schwarcz executed for the murder of an Arab policeman
 17 August – The founding of the moshav Beit Yehoshua
 25 August – The founding of the kibbutz Ein HaMifratz
 26 August – 24 Arabs were killed and 39 wounded by a bomb in the Jaffa vegetable market.
 30 August – The founding of the kibbutz Ma'ayan Tzvi
 2 October – 1936–1939 Arab revolt in Palestine: In the 1938 Tiberias massacre, Arab rioters kill 19 Jews in the city of Tiberias, eleven of whom are children. During the massacre, 70 armed Arabs set fire to Jewish homes and the local synagogue.
 12 October – The British Government announces sending a further four battalions to Palestine.
 18 October – British army troops regain control of the old city of Jerusalem, which is occupied by Arab extremists in early October.
 9 November – A technical British committee, known as the Woodhead Commission, rejected the Peel Commission partition plan mostly on the grounds that it could not be achieved without a large forced transfer of Arabs. It proposed "a modification of partition which, ...seems, subject to certain reservations, to form a satisfactory basis of settlement", if the U.K is prepared to provide a "sufficient assistance to enable the Arab State to balance its budget".
 16 November – The founding of the moshav Sharona
 17 November – The founding of the moshav Geulim
 24 November – The founding of the kibbutz Eilon
 25 November – The founding of the kibbutz Neve Eitan
 25 November – The founding of the kibbutz Kfar Ruppin
 29 November – The founding of the kibbutz Kfar Masaryk
 22 December – The founding of the kibbutz Mesilot

Unknown dates
 The founding of the moshav Sde Warburg
 The founding of the moshav Ramat Hadar

Notable births
 13 January – Yehoshua Porath, Israeli historian (died 2019)
 24 January – Yoram Taharlev, Israeli poet, author, and comedian (died 2022)
 30 January – Yoram Tsafrir, Israeli archaeologist (died 2015)
 13 March – Dan Margalit, Israeli journalist
 3 April – Boaz Moav, Israeli politician, academic, and activist (died 2002)
 14 April – Rivka Michaeli, Israeli actress
 1 July – Ilana Karaszyk, Israeli Olympic runner, long jumper
 14 July – Moshe Safdie, Israeli-American architect and urban designer
 21 July – Ya'akov Ahimeir, Israeli journalist and television and radio personality
 9 August – Moshe Maya, Israeli rabbi and politician
 29 August – Amnon Reshef, Israeli general
 29 August – Ofer Bar-Yosef, Israeli archaeologist and anthropologist
 3 October – Dan Bar-On, Israeli psychologist (died 2008)
 29 October – Ralph Bakshi, Israeli-American director of animated and live-action films
 4 December – Nava Arad, Israeli politician and Member of Knesset (1981–1992, 1995–1996) (died 2022)
 Full date unknown
 Amos Meller, Israeli composer and conductor (died 2007)
 Dan Meyerstein, Israeli chemist and resident of Ariel University
 Salman Abu-Sitta, Palestinian Arab researcher
 Naji al-Ali, Palestinian Arab cartoonist (died 1987)
 Ahmed Jibril, Palestinian Arab, founder and leader of the militant group PFLP-GC
 Abu Ali Mustafa, Palestinian Arab, member of the PLO executive (died 2001)

Notable deaths

References

 
1938